New Non-Fiction is the fifth album by American singer-songwriter Susan Werner, released in 2001 (see 2001 in music).

Track listing
All songs written by Susan Werner, except where noted

"Stationary" – 3:16
"Shade of Grey" – 3:50
"Blue Guitar" – 2:55
"Yellow House" – 2:14
"(It's OK To) Feel Good" – 3:55
"All of the Above" – 3:41
"Everybody's Talkin'" (Fred Neil) – 4:06
"Misery and Happiness" – 4:44
"Barbed Wire Boys" – 3:20
"Big Car" – 3:08
"Nefertiti's Dream" – 3:38
"Epilogue: May I Suggest" – 3:28

Personnel
Susan Werner – acoustic guitar, vocals, background vocals, Wurlitzer
Richard Bell – Hammond organ, Wurlitzer
Kenneth Blevins – drums
Byron House – bass
Colin Linden – acoustic guitar, dobro, electric guitar, baritone guitar
Jon Randall – background vocals
David Roe – gut string guitar
Tammy Rogers – mandolin

Production
Producer: Colin Linden
Engineer: Susan Werner, John Whynot
Mixing: John Whynot
Mixing assistant: Chad Brown
Mastering: John Whynot
Instrumentation: Colin Linden
Art direction: Steve Cook
Design: Steve Cook
Photography: Lauren Lyons

Susan Werner albums
2001 albums